Liam Bennett (born 30 November 2001) is an English professional footballer who plays as a right-back for Cambridge United.

He spent the start of the 2022/23 season out on loan at League Two side Walsall, where they found themselves in play off places contention after a run of unbeaten games. Unfortunately for the Saddler’s, Cambridge recalled their man in form at the end of December 2022.

Fast forward to the beginning of February 2023 and Cambridge held out a 1-1 draw against promotion favourites Ipswich Town, a promising display from Cambridge’s number 28 was then topped off when he won January’s player of the month award poll on Cambridge United’s twitter page.

Club career
Bennett initially trialled at Cambridge United while playing for Sudbury. He signed for Cambridge United partner club, St Neots Town in 2020, before eventually joining Cambridge United themselves ahead of the 2021–22 season. Having made ten appearances across his first season, Bennett signed a new two-year contract, with the option for a further year, in May 2022.

On 15 June 2022, Bennett joined League Two club Walsall on a season-long loan deal. On 31 December, Cambridge United manager Mark Bonner chose to recall Bennett from his loan deal following a number of defensive injuries picked up by the club.

Career statistics

Club
.

Notes

References

2001 births
Living people
English footballers
Association football defenders
A.F.C. Sudbury players
St Neots Town F.C. players
Cambridge United F.C. players
Hemel Hempstead Town F.C. players
Walsall F.C. players
Southern Football League players
National League (English football) players
English Football League players